The Surfer is a 1986 Australian film directed by Frank Shields and starring Gary Day and Gosia Dobrowolska.

Plot
The screenplay concerns a beach bum whose best friend is murdered and who becomes involved in a cross country chase.

Cast
Gary Day
Rod Mullinar
Tony Barry
Kris McQuade

Reception
The film was invited to screen at the Directors Fortnight segment of the 1987 Cannes Film Festival.

References

External links

The Surfer at Oz Movies

Australian action thriller films
1986 films
1980s English-language films
Films directed by Frank Shields
1980s Australian films